Durham Cricket Board played in List A cricket matches between 1999 and 2003. This is a list of the players who appeared in those matches.

Jim Allenby (2002): J Allenby
Stephen Ball (1999–2000): S Ball
Shaun Birbeck (1999–2000): SD Birbeck
Simon Birtwisle (2002–2003): SJ Birtwisle
Graeme Bridge (1999–2002): GD Bridge
Gary Brown (1999–2001): GK Brown
Paul Burn (1999): P Burn
Steven Chapman (2000): S Chapman
Kyle Coetzer (2003): KJ Coetzer
Mark Davies (2000–2001): AM Davies
Ashley Day (2001–2002): AC Day
Christopher Dodsley (2001): CW Dodsley
Andrew Hall (1999): AJ Hall
Adrian Hedley (1999): AJ Hedley
Christopher Hewison (1999): CJ Hewison
Quentin Hughes (2000–2002): QJ Hughes
Stephen Humble (2001–2002): S Humble
Ian Hunter (2001–2003): ID Hunter
Christopher Mann (2001): C Mann
Gordon Muchall (2001): GJ Muchall
Phil Mustard (2000–2003): P Mustard
Nadeem Khan (2002): Nadeem Khan
Marcus North (2000–2003): MJ North
Graham Onions (2003): G Onions
Ian Pattison (2000–2003): I Pattison
Liam Plunkett (2002–2003): LE Plunkett
Gary Pratt (2001): GJ Pratt
Lee Rushworth (2001): LJ Rushworth
Gary Scott (2001–2002): GM Scott
Graham Shaw (1999–2000): G Shaw
David Sherrington (1999): D Sherrington
Gareth Smith (1999–2001): G Smith
Benjamin Usher (1999–2000): BC Usher
Richard Waite (2001–2003): RP Waite
David Wilson (2002–2003): D Wilson
Allan Worthy (2000–2003): A Worthy

References

Durham Cricket Board